Laurent Ribardière founded the French company 4D SAS and its US Subsidiary 4D Inc in 1984, when he began development of 4th Dimension (or 4D) which was code-named Silver Surfer at the time. 4D had its initial product release in 1987 with its own Programming Language.

Laurent is the original author of Wakanda and founded the Wakanda SAS company.

References

20th-century French businesspeople
French computer programmers
1964 births
Living people